Christian Charles Blackshaw  (born 18 January 1949, in Cheshire, England) is a British classical pianist.
  
He was educated at The King's School, Macclesfield. In his teens he played oboe (as well as piano) in the Stockport Youth Orchestra in Greater Manchester. He studied at the Royal Northern College of Music, and at the Royal Academy of Music with Gordon Green. He then studied at the Saint Petersburg Conservatory under Moisei Halfin. He was later tutored in London by Clifford Curzon.

Blackshaw lives between London and Suffolk, and has three daughters. After the death of his wife of cancer, Blackshaw quit the concert hall for many years and returned to play in public in 2011-2012 performing a series of concerts of the complete Sonatas by Mozart

He was appointed a Member of the Order of the British Empire (MBE) in the 2019 New Year Honours for services to music.

References

External links
 CHRISTIAN BLACKSHAW: Home
 Rayfield Allied profile
 Steinway & Sons - Steinway Pianos - The Artists

British classical pianists
Male classical pianists
Living people
1949 births
21st-century classical pianists
Members of the Order of the British Empire
21st-century British male musicians